Leanne Bartolo (born 17 September 1987) is the current WFF European Bikini champion. A psychology graduate and primary school teacher by profession, Bartolo is also a fully qualified fitness instructor and a certified TRX instructor.
Bartolo's victory automatically elevated her to compete in the "pros" section on the same night, where she placed second. It was another accolade after placing third at the World Bikini Competition award in November 2017.

References

1987 births
Living people
Maltese sportswomen
People from Naxxar
Female bodybuilders